AD 89 (LXXXIX) was a common year starting on Thursday (link will display the full calendar) of the Julian calendar. At the time, it was known as the Year of the Consulship of Fulvus and Atratinus (or, less frequently, year 842 Ab urbe condita). The denomination AD 89 for this year has been used since the early medieval period, when the Anno Domini calendar era became the prevalent method in Europe for naming years.

Events

By place

Europe 
 January 1 – Lucius Antonius Saturninus incites a revolt against Emperor Domitian (it is suppressed by January 24).
 Legio XIII Gemina is transferred to Dacia, to help in the war against King Decebalus.
 Aquincum (old Budapest, Óbuda) is founded (approximate date).

Asia 
 First year of Yongyuan era of the Chinese Han Dynasty.
 June – Battle of Ikh Bayan: The Han Chinese army under Dou Xian, allied with the southern Xiongnu, is victorious over the Northern Xiongnu.

By topic

Religion 
 Polycarpus I, Greek bishop of Byzantium, dies after a 20-year reign and is succeeded by Plutarch.
 The Gospel of Matthew is published in Syria or Phoenicia, by a converted Jewish scholar.
</onlyinclude>

Births 
 Sindae, Korean ruler of Goguryeo (d. 179)

Deaths 
 Lucius Antonius Saturninus, Roman politician and general
 Polycarpus I, Greek bishop of Byzantium

References 

0089

als:80er#Johr 89